Woodside Park is a suburban residential area in London. It is located in the London Borough of Barnet, in the North Finchley postal district of N12.

Description
The area to the east of the tube station consists predominantly of large Victorian and Edwardian houses, many of which have been converted into flats. It also contains Woodside Park Synagogue and a Jewish school operating from the synagogue.

The western and north-western part of the area, which can also be regarded as the part of Totteridge in N12 rather than N20, is sometimes called Woodside Park Garden Suburb and consists of semi-detached or detached 3 to 4 bedroom houses built in the 1950s. It includes the Woodside Park Club. The eastern boundary of the Garden Suburb is the Dollis Brook and the southern boundary is the Folly Brook. To the south of this suburb is Woodside Park Garden Suburb proper, an area of 1920s and 1930s houses, where all but one of the roads (Linkside) are named after places in Sussex, where the developer, one Fred Ingram, came from.

Between the Garden Suburb and the Northern line is an area originally of Victorian housing. Many of the houses, including the former residence of Spike Milligan (now marked by a blue plaque placed in 2004 - see picture in this article), have been replaced by modern housing or flats. The estate where Emma Bunton grew up is also located in the area.

There is a small amount of commercial activity around the mini roundabout at Chanctonbury Way, known as Sussex Ring, which was originally the main shopping area for Woodside Park, providing basic services such as a post office, a butcher and an ironmonger. Since the creation of North Finchley shopping parade, many of the original shops have closed down and have been replaced by specialised businesses.

History
A house of special interest is Woodside Grange built in the late 19th century. Pevsner describes it as: "Battlemented, with an irregular E entrance front of 3-2-2 bays, with stair tower rising behind." It was built by James Turle as a home and consultancy and  later owned by Sir Arthur Douglas Derry the owner of Derry and Toms Store. In 1927 it was acquired by the Finchley Catholic Grammar School.

Geography

See also
 Woodside Park tube station

References

External links 
Woodside Park Residents' Association

Districts of the London Borough of Barnet
Areas of London